Canberra Station may refer to:

Canberra railway station in Kingston, Australian Capital Territory
Canberra MRT station, a MRT station in Sembawang, Singapore